Kelly Conheeney (born January 24, 1991) is an American soccer player who plays as a midfielder.

A native of Ridgewood, New Jersey, Conheeney played soccer at Ridgewood High School.

Career
In 2012, she played with the Ottawa Fury, scoring the final penalty kick in the league championship game to win the league title.

Conheeney suffered a concussion while at Virginia Tech in 2012, and was sidelined for three years. In April 2016, she made the opening day roster for Sky Blue FC. She scored the game-winning goal in Sky Blue FC's first game of the 2016 NWSL season.

References

External links
Virginia Tech bio
 

1991 births
Living people
American women's soccer players
People from Ridgewood, New Jersey
Ridgewood High School (New Jersey) alumni
Soccer players from New Jersey
Sportspeople from Bergen County, New Jersey
Virginia Tech Hokies women's soccer players
NJ/NY Gotham FC players
National Women's Soccer League players
Women's association football midfielders
Ottawa Fury (women) players
USL W-League (1995–2015) players
American expatriate sportspeople in Canada
American expatriate sportspeople in Sweden
Damallsvenskan players
Hammarby Fotboll (women) players
Expatriate women's footballers in Sweden
Expatriate women's soccer players in Canada